Cychrus cylindricollis is a species of ground beetle in the subfamily of Carabinae. It was described by Pini in 1871.

Description
The body show a brilliant black with irregular small streaks and granulation. The head is long and narrow with a flat forehead. The eyes are small and antennas are quite long. The long prothorax is almost cylindrical. Elytra are globose, fused together; the second pair of wings is atrophied. The long and thin black legs are suited for running.

Distribution
This snail eater coleopter is endemic to Italian Alps, between Lake of Como and Lake of Garda.

Ethology
Cychrus cylindricollis has nocturnal habits. Both adults and larvae feed on small gastropods. The narrow and elongated head and thorax allow this coleopter to penetrate into the shells of the snails.

References

External links
 Koleopterologie.de

cylindricollis
Beetles described in 1871